UTV Live is a British television news service broadcast and produced by UTV.

Overview

The main edition of UTV Live airs from 18:00 to 18:30 every weeknight, covering the day's news, current affairs and sport from across Northern Ireland.

The 18:00 programme (known on air as UTV Live at Six) is broadcast from UTV's headquarters in City Quays 2, Belfast. UTV also has studio facilities at Parliament Buildings, Stormont and news bureaux in Derry and Dublin with an intention to open a further bureau in Omagh. The station also makes use of video journalists based in Coleraine, Enniskillen and Newry.

History
UTV Live was introduced in January 1993 as a new name for Ulster Television's existing news programmes; Six Tonight, the station's half-hour evening news magazine, and Ulster Newstime for shorter bulletins.

Following the introduction of the ITV Evening News in March 1999, the programme was brought forward by half an hour to start at 17:30. The first half-hour saw feature reports, light-hearted stories and the weather forecast branded as part of a separate programme, UTV Life, which ran before the main evening news, started at 18:00 and kept the UTV Live name. UTV Live and UTV Life were merged into one hour-long programme, running from 17:30, in 2002 and were split into separate programmes again on 3 September 2007, with the original titles in use from 1999 to 2001.

Mid-morning weekday and lunchtime weekend UTV Live bulletins were axed in February 2009 when the station was permitted to reduce their weekly news output from five hours and twenty minutes to four hours by regulator Ofcom following a lengthy review of the viability of PSB content across the whole UK. A separate sports bulletin, Sport on Sunday, was broadcast following the Sunday evening bulletin from September 1999 to early 2007. This bulletin was separate from the Sunday evening news as it was sponsored by the Daily Mirror.

Between February 2007 and April 2009, only the main weekday evening programme was branded as UTV Live, while all other bulletins were branded as UTV News.

UTV Live broadcast its final edition from Havelock House on 29 June 2018 and began broadcasting from UTV's new headquarters at City Quays on 2 July 2018.

UTV Live Tonight
On 27 April 2009, UTV launched a 30-minute late evening news and current affairs programme, UTV Live Tonight, which aired after News at Ten on Monday – Thursday nights and incorporated the station's late news bulletin alongside extended political and business coverage.

On 10 August 2016, it was announced that UTV were axing the programme at the end of September 2016 and replacing it with a ten-minute late news bulletin, airing each weekday after News at Ten.

The final edition of UTV Live Tonight aired on 29 September 2016. The station introduced a weekly hour-long Monday night current affairs programme called View from Stormont in October 2016.

UTV Life
UTV Life, a separate live magazine programme concentrating on features and light-hearted stories, was broadcast at 17:30 on weekdays. This programme had its own editor and presenting/reporting team.

UTV Life originally began on 8 March 1999 as a stand-alone programme with features reports, light-hearted stories and an extended weather forecast. The programme ran from 17:30, preceding UTV Live at Six until the two programmes were integrated into an hour-long UTV Live programme in April 2002.

The UTV Life branding for the features section of UTV Live returned to on-air use in September 2007. The features element of the became a separate programme to accommodate a sponsorship deal. The relaunch of UTV Life saw the programme gain a different theme tune, opening title sequence and graphic design, with a similar presenting, reporting and editorial team as the former features segment of UTV Live.

As part of cost-cutting measures and a reduction in regional programming at the station, UTV Life was axed shortly after the broadcasting regulator OFCOM gave UTV the go ahead to reduce its non-news output, with the final programme airing on 6 February 2009.

The series returned in January 2016 in a weekly 30-minute timeslot on Friday nights, following the late UTV Live bulletin and presented by Pamela Ballantine. The programme returned to a weekly primetime slot at 20:00 in September 2016. Following a new schedule on ITV1/UTV from 2022, UTV Live now airs on Fridays at 7pm - following the ITV Evening News.

Notable current on air team

Aidan Browne (Newsreader)
Paul Clark (UTV Live co-presenter)
Tracey Magee (Political editor)
Marc Mallett (News correspondent)
Mark McFadden (North West correspondent)
Rose Neill (UTV Live co-presenter)

Former notable on air team
Lynda Bryans – presenter (1996–2010)
Tina Campbell – presenter 
Jamie Delargy (Business editor)
Jane Loughrey (Correspondent)
Frank Mitchell (Weather presenter)
Mike Nesbitt – presenter (1993–2006); former Leader of the Ulster Unionist Party
Gillian Porter (Newsreader)
Ken Reid (Political editor)
Kate Smith – presenter (1993–2006); now a member of the Northern Ireland Screen board

In October 2008, UTV announced its intention to cut 13 jobs in the news department due to corporate restructuring. The station declared it was offering staff a voluntary redundancy package. Staff who were reported to have accepted the redundancy package were:
Ivan Little – reporter (1980–2009); now freelancer
Claire McCollum – presenter/reporter (2000–09)
Jeanie Johnston – Features Editor (2000–09); Reporter (1978–2009)
Fearghal McKinney – presenter/reporter (1994–2009)
Adrian Logan – sports editor; sports presenter/reporter (1985–2009)

References

External links

1993 British television series debuts
1990s British television series
2000s British television series
2010s British television series
2020s British television series
English-language television shows
Irish television news shows
ITV regional news shows
Television news in Northern Ireland
Television shows from Northern Ireland
Television shows produced by Ulster Television
UTV (TV channel)